The 2015 MLS Cup Playoffs (officially the Audi 2015 MLS Cup Playoffs for sponsorship reasons) was the 20th post-season tournament culminating the Major League Soccer regular season. The tournament began on October 28 with D.C. United defeating New England Revolution and culminated on December 6, 2015 with MLS Cup 2015, the twentieth league championship match for MLS.

Twelve teams (top 6 per conference) competed, up from 10 the last 3 seasons. The first round of each conference had the third-seeded team hosting the sixth seed, while the fourth-seed hosts the fifth, in a single match to determine who advances to the Conference Semifinals. In the Conference Semifinals, the top seed plays the lowest remaining seed while the second seed plays the next-lowest. The winners advanced to the Conference Finals.

Both the Conference Semifinals and Conference Finals are played as two-legged aggregate series. If teams are level at the end of the second leg, the away goals rule will be used in attempt to determine a winner. If the away goals rule does not resolve the deadlock, 30 minutes of extra time will be played, but the away goals rule will not be applied after extra time. If scores are still level following extra time, a penalty shootout will be conducted.

The winners advance to the MLS Cup final, a single match hosted by the participant with the better record.

The winner of MLS Cup 2015, Portland Timbers qualified for the 2016–17 CONCACAF Champions League. If a Canadian team were to win the MLS Cup, the next-best team from the United States will take their place.

On March 6, 2015, Audi was announced as the official sponsor of the playoffs starting in 2015.

The Portland Timbers won the MLS Cup by defeating the Columbus Crew SC by a score of 2–1. The Timbers' Diego Valeri scored the fastest goal in MLS Cup history at 27 seconds after Crew goalkeeper Steve Clark, made a fundamental error after he miscontrolled his defender's back-pass; allowing Valeri to strike at the opportunity.

2015 MLS Conference standings 
The top 6 teams from each conference advance to the MLS Cup playoffs. Green background denotes also qualified for 2016–17 CONCACAF Champions League.

Eastern Conference

Western Conference

Bracket

Schedule

Knockout Round

Eastern Conference

Western Conference

Conference Semifinals

Eastern Conference 

New York Red Bulls win 2–0 on aggregate

Columbus Crew wins 4–3 on aggregate

Western Conference 

Portland Timbers win 2–0 on aggregate

FC Dallas wins 4–2 on penalties after 3–3 draw on aggregate

Conference Finals

Eastern Conference 

Columbus Crew wins 2–1 on aggregate

Western Conference 

Portland Timbers win 5–3 on aggregate

MLS Cup

Goalscorers

References 

2015 Major League Soccer season
2015